The 10th Squadron was a squadron of the 8th Air Wing of the Japan Air Self-Defense Force based at Tsuiki Air Field, in Fukuoka Prefecture, Japan. It was equipped with North American F-86F Sabre aircraft.

History
On January 18, 1962 the squadron was formed at Nyutabaru Air Base in Miyazaki Prefecture as part of the 5th Air Wing. After five months it was attached to the 7th Air Wing. On May 15, 1962 it moved along with the 6th Squadron to Nyutabaru Air Base in Miyazaki Prefecture. 

It was disbanded on April 1, 1977. Squadrons 1-11 were F-86F squadrons. It was replaced by the 304th Tactical Fighter Squadron which was equipped with F-4EJ Phantom II aircraft.

Aircraft operated

Fighter aircraft
 North American F-86F Sabre（1962-1977）

See also
 Fighter units of the Japan Air Self-Defense Force

References

Units of the Japan Air Self-Defense Force